Thermocyclops is a genus of crustacean in family Cyclopidae. It was first described and later extensively researched by Friedrich Kiefer, who discovered some 20 species. The species and subspecies of the genus inhabit fresh and brackish waters alike (rarely ground waters) all around the world, although most are from tropical areas.

The genus contains the following species:

Thermocyclops africae Baribwegure, Thirion & Dumont, 2001
Thermocyclops analogus Kiefer, 1936
Thermocyclops asiaticus (Kiefer, 1932)
Thermocyclops brehmi (Kiefer, 1927)
Thermocyclops brevifurcatus (Harada, 1931)
Thermocyclops byzantinus Kiefer, 1952
Thermocyclops consimilis Kiefer, 1934
Thermocyclops conspicuus Lindberg, 1950
Thermocyclops crassus (Fischer, 1853)
Thermocyclops crenulatus Brehm, 1949
Thermocyclops crucis Holynska, 2006
Thermocyclops dalmaticus Petkovski, 1956
Thermocyclops decipiens (Kiefer, 1929)
Thermocyclops decoratus Dussart, 1978
Thermocyclops dumonti Baribwegure & Mirabdullayev, 2003
Thermocyclops dybowskii (Landé, 1890)
Thermocyclops emini (Mrázek, 1898)
Thermocyclops ethiopiensis Defaye, 1988
Thermocyclops hastatus (Kiefer, 1952)
Thermocyclops hooki Löffler, 1968
Thermocyclops hyalinus (Rehberg, 1880)
Thermocyclops ianthinus Harada, 1931
Thermocyclops iguapensis W. M. Silva & Matsumura-Tundisi, 2005
Thermocyclops incisus (Kiefer, 1932)
Thermocyclops infrequens (Kiefer, 1929)
Thermocyclops inopinus (Kiefer, 1926)
Thermocyclops inversus (Kiefer, 1936)
Thermocyclops iwoyiensis Onabamiro, 1952
Thermocyclops kawamurai K. Kikuchi, 1940
Thermocyclops kivuensis Kiefer, 1952
Thermocyclops macracanthus (Kiefer, 1929)
Thermocyclops macrolasius Kiefer, 1952
Thermocyclops maheensis Lindberg, 1941
Thermocyclops microspinulosus Lindberg, 1942
Thermocyclops minutus (Lowndes, 1934)
Thermocyclops mongolicus Kiefer, 1937
Thermocyclops ndalaganus Kiefer, 1952
Thermocyclops neglectus (G. O. Sars, 1909)
Thermocyclops nigerianus Kiefer, 1932
Thermocyclops oblongatus (G. O. Sars, 1927)
Thermocyclops oithonoides (G. O. Sars, 1863)
Thermocyclops operculifer Kiefer, 1930
Thermocyclops orghidani (Plesa, 1981)
Thermocyclops orientalis Dussart & Fernando, 1985
Thermocyclops ouadanei van de Velde, 1978
Thermocyclops pachysetosus Lindberg, 1951
Thermocyclops parvus Reid, 1989
Thermocyclops philippinensis (Marsh, 1932)
Thermocyclops pseudoperculifer Holynska, 2006
Thermocyclops retroversus (Kiefer, 1929)
Thermocyclops rylovi (Smirnov, 1928)
Thermocyclops schmeili (Poppe & Mrázek, 1895)
Thermocyclops schuurmanae (Kiefer, 1928)
Thermocyclops stephanidesi Kiefer, 1938
Thermocyclops taihokuensis Harada, 1931
Thermocyclops tchadensis Dussart & Gras, 1966
Thermocyclops tenuis (Marsh, 1910)
Thermocyclops thermocyclopoides (Harada, 1931)
Thermocyclops tinctus Lindberg, 1936
Thermocyclops trichophorus Kiefer, 1930
Thermocyclops uenoi ItoTak, 1952
Thermocyclops vermifer Lindberg, 1935
Thermocyclops vizarae (Fryer, 1957)
Thermocyclops wolterecki Kiefer, 1938

References

Cyclopidae
Cyclopoida genera
Taxonomy articles created by Polbot